R. Cecil Smith (born Reginald Cecil Smith) (1880-1922) was an American screenwriter and actor active during Hollywood's silent era. He collaborated frequently with his wife, Ella Stuart Carson, and the pair often wrote under the name the R. Cecil Smiths. He sold cars before he decided to turn his talents to writing. He has often been confused with actor Robert Smith.

Selected filmography 
 Footlights and Shadows (1920)
 The Valley of Doubt (1920)
 The Shadow of Rosalie Byrnes (1920)
 The Figurehead (1920)
 The Bootlegger's Daughter (1922)
 Gilded Lies (1921)
 The Fighter (1921)
 Worlds Apart (1921)
 Broadway and Home (1920)
 The Daughter Pays (1920)
 His Wife's Money (1920)
 Sooner or Later (1920)
 What's Your Husband Doing? (1920)
 The Country Cousin (1919)
 The Law of the North (1918)
 Green Eyes (1918)
 The Claws of the Hun (1918)
 Flying Colors (1917)
 Madcap Madge (1917)

References

External links

1880 births
1922 deaths
Screenwriters from West Virginia
20th-century American screenwriters